Susan Wagle (born September 27, 1953) is an American politician who served as a Republican member of the Kansas Senate, representing the 30th district from 2001 to 2021. She was elected Kansas Senate President in 2013 and was reelected in 2017. She is the first woman to hold this position.

Early life
Wagle was born on September 27, 1953, in Allentown, Pennsylvania. In 1979, she graduated with a B.A. from Wichita State University. Wagle taught special education in Wichita public schools from 1979 to 1982 before becoming a businesswoman.

Political career

Kansas House of Representatives (1991–2001)
In 1990, Wagle was elected to the Kansas House of Representatives. Four years later she was elected by her colleagues to the position of Speaker Pro Tem, the first female in Kansas to hold that position. Wagle served in the House from 1991 to 2001. During her first term in the House, she worked with Barbara Lawrence on legislation to lower property taxes. The bills did not pass.

Kansas Senate (2001–2021)
Wagle was elected to the Kansas Senate from the 30th Senate District in 2000, taking office in 2001.

In 2003, Wagle drew national attention when she attempted to have a human sexuality class at the University of Kansas defunded due to the professor's alleged display of pornographic material. Then-Governor Kathleen Sebelius "vetoed a budget proviso to withhold more than $3 million from KU if the class materials were found to be obscene, but signed a second one directing universities to draft policies on the use of explicit sexual materials".

Wagle was elected senate president on December 3, 2012, winning 23–9 over then-Senator Steve Abrams of Arkansas City. Wagle's win was a victory of the conservative wing of the Kansas Senate over the Senate's moderate wing. She is the first female Kansas senate president, and the first senate president from Wichita. She was re-elected to the post in 2016, defeating Ty Masterson by a vote of 23–7, becoming only the fourth senate president in Kansas history to serve a second term.

In July 2018, Wagle supported Kris Kobach in a Republican gubernatorial primary, saying that he was the "strongest candidate". The endorsement was sent out by Wagle's staff spokeswoman on a state computer, thus violating Kansas ethics rules.

Wagle once "halted a controversial bill that would have enabled public and private employees to refuse service to same-sex couples on religious grounds".

On May 29, 2019, nine protesters had been singing and chanting in the Senate chamber. When they refused to stop, the Senate suspended its work; Wagle ordered that the Senate gallery be cleared. Following Wagle's request, the protesters were detained and taken to another room. The Wichita Eagle's Jonathan Shorman reported that journalists were "'prevented from witnessing the arrests'". Calling Wagle's action "unprecedented" and "intolerable", the Kansas Sunshine Coalition for Open Government filed a complaint with Attorney General Derek Schmidt. Wagle countered, "'[A]t no time was the press denied access to Senate proceedings. My staff was simply following instructions during a time of recess to ensure the safety of everyone in the chamber'". Attorney General Derek Schmidt later determined the Senate was within its authority to clear the gallery and that an investigation did not indicate any business was conducted while members of the press were absent.

At the end of the Spring 2020 legislative session, Wagle held the senate in session for 24 straight hours, passing bills to curtail Governor Laura Kelly's ability to exercise emergency powers during the COVID-19 pandemic and blocking an attempt to pass the expansion of Medicaid. The legality of the legislature's actions was disputed.

Lt. Governor candidacy (2006) 
Jim Barnett, who served in the Kansas state Senate from 2001–2009, ran in the 2006 Kansas gubernatorial election with Wagle as his running mate. They won a crowded Republican primary by almost 10% of the votes. Although a large majority of Kansans are Republicans, their ticket received only 40.44% of the votes in the general election, losing to incumbents, Governor Kathleen Sebelius and Lieutenant Governor Mark Parkinson. During the campaign, Barnett opposed the eligibility for long-term Kansas resident non-citizen immigrants, graduates of Kansas schools, to qualify for in-state tuition. However, Wagle had voted to allow such qualifications. Kris Kobach and the anti-immigration organization, Federation for American Immigration Reform (FAIR), sued on behalf of out-of-state citizen students who were allegedly suffering from discrimination, to end the waiver., in a lawsuit against the state of Kansas, challenging a state law which grants in-state tuition to undocumented immigrants. The suit was dismissed for lack of legal standing for the plaintiffs. Barnett ran for governor again in 2018., but lost the primary.

Ambassadorship pursuit
In 2018, when Wagle sought an appointment to a diplomatic post she listed Wichita native Phil Ruffin, a business partner of President Donald Trump, as a reference just days after she voted for a bill beneficial to Ruffin’s business interests in Kansas. Wagle sought an ambassadorship to Ireland, Belize, or Belgium, or other State Department positions. She made her aspirations known in a May 7, 2018 email to a campaign operative shortly after the legislative session ended.

Wagle's pitch for such an ambassadorial post came weeks after Wichita Republican congressman Mike Pompeo received U.S. Senate approval as United States Secretary of State in April 2018. Wagle's campaign spokesman said Pompeo did not have a role in promoting her candidacy to the White House: "While she does not recall speaking to Secretary Pompeo about her interest in serving in the Administration, she did reach out to the President's team and some of their mutual friends, including Phil Ruffin, in this process."

U.S. Senate campaign (2020) 

In January 2019, Wagle formed an exploratory committee to assess entering the 2020 race for the Republican nomination for U.S. Senate, to fill the seat of the retiring Pat Roberts. In July 2019, she formally entered the race, and former Kansas Secretary of State Kris Kobach had already done so. Wagle criticized Kobach's role in a controversial, privately-financed scheme to build a southern border wall to impede the unlawful entry of migrants to the United States. Wagle expressed support for the construction of a federally designed, bid and funded wall, but added, "We don’t need some rogue organization going out and building the wall." Wichita and Las Vegas billionaire and casino business partner of Donald Trump, Phil Ruffin, has been supportive of Wagle's U.S. Senate campaign.  In April 2020, Mike Kuckelman, the chair of the Kansas Republican Party, urged Wagle and several other candidates to drop out of the U.S. Senate race, to prevent Kris Kobach from winning the GOP nomination. She had about $515,000 in unexpended campaign funds. Wagle persistently polled in the single digits in 2020.

In a statement, Wagle said she withdrew her candidacy before the candidate filing deadline , in favor of party unity, her work in the Kansas Legislature addressing the ongoing Coronavirus pandemic crisis, and to spend time with her family after the recent death of her daughter who had 4 young children and had relapsed with Multiple Myeloma.

Other political involvement
Wagle served as a delegate to the 1996 Republican National Convention. She served as National Chairman of the American Legislative Exchange Council (ALEC) in 2006. As of 2019, she was a member of ALEC's Board of Directors.

Political positions

Abortion
While Wagle identified as pro-choice as a young adult, the experience of pregnancy led her to change her stance. She is considered a staunchly pro-life legislator.

In 2003, Wagle "successfully pushed a bill to require abortion clinics to provide information on human development to women considering an abortion".

In 2015, Wagle sponsored a bill known as the Kansas Unborn Child Protection from Dismemberment Abortion Act. It would have prohibited a person from performing, or attempting to perform, a dismemberment abortion unless it was necessary to preserve the life of the mother. The law was found unconstitutional by the Kansas Supreme Court.

Wagle opposed the confirmation of David Toland as Kansas Secretary of Commerce in 2019. As director of a local non-profit, Tolan had obtained a grant from a charitable fund posthumously named after George Tiller, an assassinated physician who had performed abortions. The grant funding did not relate to abortion; however, Wagle's spokesperson, Shannon Golden, called the relationship with the Tiller fund "concerning". Toland was later confirmed.

In 2020, Wagle linked unblocking passage of a bill to expand Medicare in Kansas to passage of a constitutional amendment that prohibited abortion.

Gambling
Despite Wagle and her husband owning bingo halls, she generally opposed gambling expansion in Kansas. She has received contributions from gambling interest including $1,000 to her 2018 state Senate race from Phil  Ruffin. Ruffin also contributed $5,000 more, the maximum allowable in federal campaigns, to her 2020 primary for the U.S. Senate. Asked about the contributions by a McClatchy newspaper reporter, Ruffin became angry and ended the call.

Redistricting
In October 2020, a video surfaced in which Wagle encouraged Republican donors to help elect a supermajority in the state legislature in advance of redistricting. Like most states, the Kansas legislature draws the congressional and legislative maps. In an attempt to give her party an advantage, Kansas Governor Laura Kelly asked the state legislature to form an independent redistricting commission.

Government accountability
In 2018, Wagle cosponsored legislation with Kansas Senate Minority Leader Anthony Hensley that worked to bring more transparency to state contracts. The bill required lobbyist registration for anyone attempting to influence officials in state agencies or the executive branch over a state contract. Prior to the enactment of this legislation, lobbying efforts were only required to be disclosed if such efforts were directed toward the legislative branch. Wagle stated the need for this legislation arose due to a lack of transparency within the administration of Republican former Governor Sam Brownback.

As Commerce Committee Chairwoman, Wagle began an investigation into the Kansas Bioscience Authority (KBA) in 2011. The KBA was founded under former Governor Kathleen Sebelius with the goal of spurring growth in the bioscience sector. The KBA had an independent board that approved spending. Wagle called for an investigation due to excessive spending on salaries, benefits, travel, and entertainment. Wagle noticed a stark difference between the state's 12-year investment and its final return. The state had invested $240 million into the KBA. The legislature and Governor Sam Brownback intended to fill budget holes left by massive tax cuts benefitting the wealthiest Kansans by selling the KBA for $25 million and slashing budgets for highways, schools and Medicare. The sale of the authority netted only $14 million.
Wagle called for an audit and review for the abuse of taxpayer dollars which ultimately led to the shutdown of KBA for findings of misspent funds. The legislature passed a $1.2 billion tax increase and overrode Brownback's veto of the measure. Wagle cast the deciding vote to override but did not comment on her vote.

Medicaid
In February 2020, Wagle sought to block the federally-funded expansion of Medicaid by the Kansas legislature out of concern that it would lead to taxpayer funded abortions in the state. She outlined her reasoning in a guest column published in The Wichita Eagle on February 14, 2020.

COVID-19

In April 2020, Kelly instituted orders to restrict the rapid spread of COVID-19, limiting public gatherings to a maximum of ten individuals. Since the orders would have applied to Easter Sunday masses, the Republican-majority (5–2) Legislative Coordinating Council (LCC) reversed her orders as applied to church assemblies. Wagle opposed Kelly's orders and supported the Republican attempt to block them, saying that "Governor Kelly’s orders display her misplaced priorities." Of the initial eleven identified sources of contagion in Kansas, three were identified as having come from recent religious gatherings. Forty-four state governors had imposed similar restrictions, with 18 states closing churches completely. As a precedent, Kansas churches had been ordered closed during the 1918–1919 "Spanish Flu" pandemic.

Kansas challenged the LCC's decision in court, saying that the council and Republican state Attorney General Derek Schmidt had "weakened and confused our emergency response efforts, putting every Kansan at risk."  The Kansas Supreme Court reinstated Kelly's orders, saying the LCC's reasoning was "flawed," and it did not have the power to overrule the governor.

Sexual harassment reform
After former Democratic staffer Abbie Hodgson complained about widespread harassment and inappropriate requests from legislators, Wagle said that in five years as senate president, she had never received any such complaints. Subsequently in 2017, Wagle worked to implement changes in sexual harassment policies at the Kansas Capitol. Those changes included mandatory training sessions, anonymous reporting, and protections for interns.

Supreme Court appointment process
Wagle has expressed disagreement with State Supreme Court decisions and has attempted to change the process for nomination and confirmation of justices. In 2013, Wagle voted with 27 of her colleagues for a constitutional amendment that would change the nomination process for Kansas Supreme Court justices from the existing system in which the Kansas Supreme Court Nominating Commission identifies three candidates, of whom the governor selects one, to the "federal model" where the governor nominates a candidate and the Senate votes to confirm the nominee.

Personal life
Wagle is married to Tom Wagle. The Wagles, who reside in Wichita, have four children, and Susan Wagle has three step-children. As of July 2020, the Wagles had 16 grandchildren.

Wagle survived bouts with cancer in 1995, 2003, and 2012. Her son, Paul, survived leukemia during his childhood. In March 2020, Wagle's daughter, Julia Scott, died from multiple myeloma after a four-year battle with the disease.

References

External links
Kansas Senate
Project Vote Smart profile
 Follow the Money campaign contributions
 1996, 1998, 2000, 2002, 2004, 2006, 2008

1953 births
20th-century American politicians
20th-century American women politicians
21st-century American politicians
21st-century American women politicians
Candidates in the 2006 United States elections
Candidates in the 2020 United States Senate elections
Living people
Republican Party members of the Kansas House of Representatives
Politicians from Wichita, Kansas
Presidents of the Kansas Senate
Republican Party Kansas state senators
Wichita State University alumni
Women state legislators in Kansas
Conservatism in the United States